Burhan C. Doğançay (11 September 1929 – 16 January 2013) was a Turkish-American artist. Doğançay is best known for tracking walls in various cities across the world for half a century, integrating them in his artistic work.

Biography
Born in Istanbul, Turkey, Burhan Dogançay obtained his artistic training from his father Adil Doğançay, and Arif Kaptan, both well-known Turkish painters. In his youth, Dogançay played on the Gençlerbirliği football (soccer) team. In 1950, he received a law degree from the University of Ankara. While enrolled at the University of Paris between 1950–1955, from where he obtained a doctorate degree in economics, he attended art courses at the Académie de la Grande Chaumière. During this period he continued to paint regularly and to show his works in several group exhibitions. Soon after his return to Turkey, he participated in many exhibitions, including joint exhibitions with his father at the Ankara Art Lovers Club.

Following a brief career with the government (diplomatic service), which brought him to New York City in 1962, Dogançay decided in 1964 to devote himself entirely to art and to make New York his permanent home. He started searching the streets of New York for inspiration and raw materials for his collage and assemblages. He began to think it was impossible to make a reasonable living as an artist. Thomas M. Messer, director of the Solomon R. Guggenheim Museum for 27 years, significantly influenced Dogançay, urging him to stay in New York and face the city's challenges.

In the 1970s, Dogançay started traveling for his Walls of the World photographic documentary project. He met his future wife, Angela, at the Hungarian Ball at the Hotel Pierre in New York. In 2006, a painting by Dogancay titled Trojan Horse was gifted by the Turkish government to the OECD in Paris. Dogançay lived and worked during the last eight years of his life alternating between his studios in New York and Turgutreis, Turkey. He died at the age of 83 in January 2013.

Artistic contribution
Since the early 1960s, Dogançay had been fascinated by urban walls and chose them as his subject. He considered them the barometer of societies and a testament to the passage of time, reflecting the emotions of a city, frequently withstanding the assault of the elements and the markings left by people. It began, Dogancay said, when something caught his eye during a walk along 86th street in New York:

It was the most beautiful abstract painting I had ever seen. There were the remains of a poster, and a texture to the wall with little bits of shadows coming from within its surface. The color was mostly orange, with a little blue and green and brown. Then, there were the marks made by rain and mud.

As a city traveler, for half a century he mapped and photographed walls in various cities worldwide. In this context, urban walls serve as documents of the respective climate and zeitgeist, as ciphers of social, political and economic change. Part of the intrinsic spirit of his work is to suggest that nothing is ever what it seems. Dogançay's art is wall art, and thus his sources of subjects are real. Therefore, he can hardly be labeled as an abstract artist, and yet at first acquaintance much of his work appears to be abstract. In Dogançay's approach, the serial nature of investigation and the elevation of characteristic elements to form ornamental patterns are essential. Within this, he formulates a consistent continuation of decollagist strategies – effectively the re-contextualised deconstruction of positions related to the nouveau réalistes. Dogançay may have started out as a simple observer and recorder of walls, but he fast made a transition to being able to express a range of ideas, feelings, and emotions in his work. His vision continued to broaden, driven both by content and technique.

Walls of the World

In the mid-1970s, Dogançay embarked on what he thought of as a secondary project: photographing urban walls all over the globe. These photographs – which Dogançay called Walls of the World – are an archive of our time and the seeds for his paintings, which also expressed contemporary times. The focus of his "encyclopedic" approach was exclusively directed toward the structures, signs, symbols and images that humans leave on walls. Here he found the entire range of the human condition in a single motif, without any cultural, racial, political, geographical, or stylistic, limitations. Dogançay got to the heart of his exploration when he said:

Walls are the mirror of society.

Dogancay's consequential execution, his radical thematic self-limitation and obsession with capturing what interested him most is comparable to other "documentarians" such as August Sander (portraits) and Karl Blossfeldt (plants). His pictures are not snapshots but elaborate segmentations of surfaces, subtle studies of materials, colors, structures and light, sometimes resembling monochromies in their radical reductionism. Over time, this project gained importance as well as content; after  four decades it encompasses about 30'000 images from more than 100 countries across five continents. In 1982, images from the archive were exhibited as a one-man exhibition at the Centre Georges Pompidou, Paris; it later traveled to the Palais des Beaux-Arts, Brussels, and the Musée d'Art Contemporain, Montreal.

Painting and collage

With posters and objects gathered from walls forming the main ingredient for his work, Dogançay's preferred medium has been predominantly 'collage' and to some extent 'fumage'. Dogançay re-creates the look of urban billboards, graffiti-covered wall surfaces, as well as broken or neglected entrances, such as windows and doors, in different series. The only masters with whom he compares himself are Robert Rauschenberg and Jasper Johns from the last heroic period of art, of which he was a part. Dogancay, however, has always preferred to reproduce fragments of wall surface in their mutual relations just as he found them, and with minimal adjustment of color or position, rather than to up-end them or combine them casually as in the Rauschenberg manner.

In large measure his practice has been one of simulation in the spirit of record-keeping, carried out with the collector's rather than the scavenger's eye. In many cases, his paintings evoke the decay and destruction of the city, the alienated feeling that urban life is in ruins and out of control, and cannot be integrated again. Pictorial fragments are often detached from their original context and rearranged in new, sometimes inscrutable combinations. His complex and uniformly experimental painterly oeuvre ranges from photographic realism to abstraction, from pop art to material image/montage/collage.

In the 1970s and 1980s, he gained fame with his interpretation of urban walls in his signature ribbons series, which consist of clean paper strips and their calligraphy-like shadows. These contrast with his collaged billboard works, such as the Cones Series, Doors Series or Alexander's Walls. These brightly intense, curvilinear ribbon forms seem to burst forth from flat, solid-colored backgrounds. The graceful ribbonlike shapes take on a three-dimensional quality, especially as suggested by the implied shadows. This series later gave rise to alucobond–aluminum composite shadow sculptures and the series known as Aubusson Tapestries.

Tamarind lithography 

In 1969, Henry Geldzahler, then head of 20th Century Art Department at the Metropolitan Museum of Art, secured a fellowship for Dogancay at the Tamarind Lithography Workshop in Los Angeles. The workshop, founded by June Wayne, was a ten-year project, attended by approximately seventy artists – among them were Ed Ruscha, Jim Dine, Josef Albers and Louise Nevelson – between 1960 and 1970, conceived to promote lithography in the USA. Dogancay created sixteen lithographs, including a suite of eleven impressions titled Walls V. These marked a turning point in his career as they are essentially a dialogue with flatness. At the workshop, in part because of the medium, he was obliged to relinquish his casual approach, inspired by his raw subject matter, in favor of organizing his work graphically. This imposed discipline helped him to create arresting new effects that led to more defined flat areas and brighter colors within the images. Dogancay created a new resolution between subject and method, and was a profound influence on his future evolution as an artist. A canon of high-colored tonality and visual impact has remained for him the essence of urban contradiction which he wants to share with viewers of his works.

Aubusson Tapestry

In Paris, Dogancay was introduced to Jean-François Picaud, owner of L'Atelier Raymond Picaud in Aubusson, France. Fascinated by Dogançay's Ribbons series and believing they would be ideal tapestry subjects, he invited Dogançay to submit several tapestry cartoons. In the words of Jean-François Picaud, "the art of tapestry has found its leader for the 21st century in Burhan Dogançay". The first three Dogançay tapestries woven in 1984 were an immediate critical success.

Art market

In November 2009, one of Dogançay's paintings, Mavi Senfoni (Symphony in Blue), was sold in auction to Murat Ülker for US$1,700,000. This collage relates to an impressive cycle of works within the Dogançay oeuvre, called Cones series, that evolved as a development of his iconic Breakthrough and Ribbon series and as an exhilarating exploration of the urban space.  Together with its two sister works, Magnificent Era (collection of Istanbul Modern) and Mimar Sinan (private collection), Symphony in Blue is one of the largest and most expressive works in which Dogançay enters into a dialogue with the history of Turkey. It was executed in 1987 for the first International Istanbul Biennial. Istanbul Modern commissioned composer Kamran Ince to set Mavi Senfoni to music. The solo piano piece was premiered by Huseyin Sermet on 26 June 2012.

In May 2015, Dogancay's painting Mavi Güzel (Blue Beauty) from the Ribbon Series sold for TL 1,050,000 (US$ 390’000) at Antik AS in Istanbul

Doğançay Museum 
The Doğançay Museum is exclusively dedicated to the work of Burhan Doğançay, and to a minor extent also to the art of his father, Adil. It provides a retrospective survey of the artist's various creative phases from his student days up to his death, with about 100 works on display. Established in 2004, the Doğançay Museum in Istanbul's Beyoğlu district is being considered to be Turkey's first contemporary art museum.

Doğançay's works are in the collections of many museums around the world including New York's MoMA, Metropolitan Museum of Art, The Solomon R. Guggenheim Museum as well as National Gallery of Art in Washington, MUMOK in Vienna, Musée National d'Art Moderne in Paris, Istanbul Modern in Istanbul, The Israel Museum in Jerusalem and The State Russian Museum in St. Petersburg.

Works in public collections (selection)

 1964: Billboard, New York, The Solomon R. Guggenheim Museum
 1964: Yankees and Beatles, London, Tate Modern
 1965: Eddie, Vienna, Albertina
 1966: Peace of Mind, Mannheim, Kunsthalle
 1966: Diner's Window, Dallas, Dallas Museum of Art
 1966: J. Payn Window, Minneapolis, Walker Art Center
 1969: New York Puzzle, Stuttgart, Staatsgalerie
 1969: untitled, Washington, National Gallery of Art
 1969: Walls V, New York, MoMA
 1969: untitled, Cambridge/MA, Harvard Art Museums
 1974: Red and Black Composition No. 5, New York, The Solomon R. Guggenheim Museum
 1975: White Cone & Shadow, Basel, Kunstmuseum
 1977: Heart No. 26, Saint-Paul de Vence, Fondation Maeght
 1979: Lofty Ribbons, London, British Museum
 1980s: Whispering Wall III, London, V&A Museum
 1980s: #150, Vienna, MAK
 1980: Long Lost Ribbons, Vienna, mumok stiftung ludwig
 1980: untitled, Bruxelles, Royal Museums of Fine Arts of Belgium
 1982: Ribbon Mania, New York, The Metropolitan Museum of Art
 1987: Magnificent Era, Istanbul, Istanbul Modern
 1987: Symphony in Blue, Istanbul, Yildiz Holding (Murat Ülker)
 1989: Kinder, Hannover, Sprengel Museum
 1989: Neruda, Stockholm, Moderna Museet
 1989: Versace Man, Los Angeles, Los Angeles County Museum
 1992: I Am Really Old, Salzburg, Museum oder Moderne
 1995: Tit Steaks, Ann Arbor/MI, University of Michigan Museum of Art
 1997: Garden of Eden, Munich, Pinakothek der Moderne
 1997: Push Love, Saint Louis, Saint Louis Art Museum
 1998: Two Fine Red Lines, Vienna, Albertina
 2002: Red Ada, Geneva, Musée d'art et d'histoire (MAH)
 2002: Throw FD, Pittsburgh, Carnegie Museum of Art
 2008: Peace Partners, Cleveland, Cleveland Museum of Art
 2009: Rising Star, Boston, Museum of Fine Arts Boston
 2011: The Days of the Fez, Vienna, Albertina

Awards 
 2005 – Contribution to the Arts Award given by the International Contemporary Art Exposition, İstanbul
 2005 – Art Honor Award given by the Art Forum Plastic Arts Fair, Ankara
 2004 – Honorary doctorate from Hacettepe University, Ankara
 2004 – Painter of the Year Award given by Sanat Kurumu, Ankara
 1995 – National Medal for the Arts for Lifetime Achievement & Cultural Contribution given by the President of the Republic of Turkey
 1992 – Medal of Appreciation given by the Ministry of Culture of Russia
 1984 – Enka Arts & Science Award, İstanbul
 1969 – Tamarind Lithography Workshop Fellowship, Los Angeles
 1964 – Certificate of Appreciation by the City of New York

Exhibitions

Solo exhibitions (selection)
1976: Istanbul: Galeri Baraz. Burhan Dogançay
1977: Zurich: Kunstsalon Wolfsberg. Acrylmalereien und Gouachen 1966–1976 
1982: Paris: Centre Georges Pompidou. Les murs murmurent, ils crient, ils chantent ... 
1983: Montreal: Musée d'art contemporain de Montréal
1983: Antwerp: International Cultural Center
1989: Tokyo: The Seibu Museum of Art–Yurakucho Art Forum. Dogançay
1992: St. Petersburg: Russian Museum. Walls and Doors 1990–91
1993: Istanbul: Atatürk Cultural Center. Walls 1990–93 (Organized by Yahşi Baraz)
2000: New York: The Brooklyn Historical Society. Bridge of Dreams. 
2001: Istanbul: Dolmabahçe Cultural Center. Dogançay: A Retrospective (Organized by Dr. Nejat F. Eczacıbaşı Foundation)
2001: Athens, Ohio: Kennedy Museum of Art–Ohio University. Dogançay–Wall Paintings from the Museum Collection
2003: Siegen: Siegerlandmuseum. Walls of the World
2012: Istanbul: Istanbul Modern. Fifty Years of Urban Walls: A Burhan Dogancay Retrospective
2014: Istanbul: Dogançay Museum. Picture the World: Burhan Dogançay as Photographer
2016: Ankara: CER Modern. Picture the World: Burhan Dogançay as Photographer
2016: Essen: Museum Folkwang. New to the collection: Burhan Dogancay
2016: Taipei: Taiwan National Museum of History. Picture the World: Burhan Dogançay as Photographer
2017: Vienna: Albertina. Burhan Dogançay (works on paper)
2018: Leverkusen: Museum Morsbroich. Zeichen an der Wand

Group exhibitions (selection)
1972: New York: Pace Gallery. Printmakers at Pace
1977: New York: Solomon R. Guggenheim Museum. From the American Collection
1983: Washington: National Museum of Natural History, Smithsonian Institution
1987: Istanbul: 1st International Istanbul Biennial
1999: New York: The Museum of the City of New York, The New York Century: World Capital, Home Town, 1900–2000
2006: Fredonia, N.Y.: Rockefeller Arts Center Art Gallery. Connoisseurship
2009: Salzburg: Museum der Moderne. SPOTLIGHT
2009: Biel/Bienne: CentrePasquArt. Collage–Décollage: Dogançay–Villeglé
2009: Berlin: Martin-Gropius-Bau. Istanbul Next Wave
2010: London: British Museum. Modern Turkish Art at the British Museum
2010: Minneapolis, MN: Walker Art Center, Perlman Gallery. 50/50: Audience and Experts Curate the Paper Collection
2012: Vienna: Belvedere, Orangerie. Kokoschka sucht einen Rahmen
2012: Maastricht: Bonnefantenmuseum. Different Impressions, Changing Traditions
2013: Boston: Museum of Fine Arts, Boston. Uncontainable Portraits
2013: Doha: Bahrain National Museum. Istanbul Modern-Bahrain
2013: Grenoble: Musée de Grenoble-Bibliothèque Teisseire-Malherbe. Les Mots dans l'Art
2013: Zurich: Museum Haus Konstruktiv. Hotspot Istanbul
2013: Minneapolis: Weisman Art Museum. Reviewing The Real
2013: New York: The Metropolitan Museum of Art. Fifty Years of Collecting Islamic Art
2014: Boston: Museum of Fine Arts. National Pride (and Prejudice)
2015: Stockholm: Moderna Museet. A Larger World
2015: Leverkusen: Museum Morsbroich. Eddie Murphy und die Milk-Brothers
2016: Los Angeles: LACMA. Islamic Art Now, Part 2
2016: Istanbul: Elgiz Museum. Faces & Masks
2016: Purchase/NY: Neuberger Museum of Art. Post No Bills: Public Walls as Studio and Source
2017: Minneapolis: Weisman Art Museum. Prince from Minneapolis
2017: Wolfsburg: Kunstmuseum Wolfsburg. Im Käfig der Freiheit
2017: Saint-Paul-de-Vence: Fondation Maeght. Is this how men live?
2018: Ankara: Evliyagil Museum. Icons of Thinking: Images and Texts
2019: Vienna: Albertina. Warhol to Richter
2019: Istanbul: Istanbul Modern. The Event of a Thread: Global Narratives in Textiles
2019: Wolfsburg: Kunstmuseum Wolfsburg. Now is the Time
2019: Geneva: MAMCO Musée d'art moderne et contemporain. Collection(s)
2020: London: Tate Modern. Materials and Objects: Collage
2021: London: British Museum. Reflections: Contemporary Art of the Middle East and North Africa
2021: Zurich: Museum Haus Konstruktiv. Works on Paper from the Collection
2021: Ann Arbor/MI: University of Michigan Museum of Art. You Are Here

References 

 Emslander, Fritz, Dogramaci, Burcu, "Burhan Doğançay Zeichen an der Wand", Wien, VfmK, 2018, 
 Schröder, Klaus-Albrecht, Lahner, Elsy, "Burhan Dogancay", Wien, Hirmer Verlag, 2017, 978-3777428871
 Köb, Eldelbert, Zuckriegel, Margit, Kushner, Marilyn, et al., "Picture the World – Burhan Dogancay As Photographer", Istanbul, Dogancay Museum Publications, 2014, 978-6056504303
 Calikogu, Levent, Giboire, Clive, Taylor, Brandon, Vine, Richard, Fifty Years of Urban Walls: A Burhan Dogançay Retrospective, Munich, Prestel, 2012, .
 Piguet, Philippe, Denaro, Dolores, Collage-Décollage:Dogancay-Villeglé, Nürnberg, Verlag für Moderne Kunst, 2009, .
 Taylor, Brandon, Urban Walls – A Generation of Collage in Europe and America, New York, Hudson Hills Press, 2008, .
 Blanchebarbe, Ursula, Walls of the World, Bielefeld, Kerber Verlag, 2003, 
 Budak, Emel, Burhan Dogancay: A Retrospective, Istanbul, Duran Editions, 2001, 
 Vine, Richard, Burhan Dogançay: Works on Paper 1950 -2000, New York: Hudson Hills Press, 2003, 
 Lopate, Phillip, Bridge of Dreams, New York, Hudson Hills Press, 1999, 
 Moyer, Roy, Rigaud, Jacques, Messer, Thomas M., Dogançay, New York, Hudson Hills Press, 1986,

External links 
Burhan Doğançay's Official Website
The Doğançay Museum's Official Website
Burhan Dogançay photographs and sketchbooks at the New-York Historical Society

1929 births
2013 deaths
Artists from New York City
Turkish artists
Turkish painters
Turkish photographers
American people of Turkish descent
Alumni of the Académie de la Grande Chaumière
Ankara University Faculty of Law alumni
Turkish footballers
Association football forwards
Gençlerbirliği S.K. footballers